The discography of Type O Negative, an American gothic metal band, consists of seven studio albums, three live albums, two compilation albums, two video albums, sixteen singles and ten music videos.

Albums

Studio albums

Compilation albums

Video albums

Singles

Music videos

References

Heavy metal group discographies
Discographies of American artists